Donal Ahern (Dan) (born 1950) is an Irish retired Gaelic football coach and player. He enjoyed a brief league and championship career with the Cork senior team from 1971 until 1973.
Born in Glanworth, County Cork, Ahern first played competitive Gaelic football at underage levels with Glanworth. He won back-to-back county minor championship medals in 1966 and 1967, before claiming a county junior championship medal in 1971. Ahern also won a county intermediate championship medal in 1976.

Ahern made his debut on the inter-county scene when he was selected on the Cork minor team in 1967. He enjoyed two championship seasons with the minors and collected back-to-back All-Ireland medals as captain. Ahern subsequently joined the Cork under-21 team, winning back-to-back All-Ireland medals in 1970 and 1971. He joined the Cork senior team in 1972 and was a member of the extended panel when the team won the All-Ireland title in 1973.

Honours

Glanworth
Cork Intermediate Football Championship (1): 1976
Cork Junior Football Championship (1): 1971
Cork Minor Football Championship (2): 1966, 1967

Cork
All-Ireland Under-21 Football Championship (2): 1970, 1971
Munster Under-21 Football Championship (3): 1969, 1970, 1971
All-Ireland Minor Football Championship (2): 1967 (c), 1968 (c)
Munster Minor Football Championship (2): 1967 (c), 1968 (c)

References

1950 births
Living people
Glanworth Gaelic footballers
Cork inter-county Gaelic footballers